Bleury-Saint-Symphorien is a former commune in the Eure-et-Loir department in northern France. It was established on 1 January 2012 by merger of the former communes of Bleury and Saint-Symphorien-le-Château. On 1 January 2016, it was merged into the new commune of Auneau-Bleury-Saint-Symphorien, and became a commune déléguée within Auneau-Bleury-Saint-Symphorien.

See also
Communes of the Eure-et-Loir department

References

Former communes of Eure-et-Loir